Chwalęcin may refer to the following places in Poland:
Chwalęcin, Lower Silesian Voivodeship (south-west Poland)
Chwalęcin, Greater Poland Voivodeship (west-central Poland)
Chwalęcin, Warmian-Masurian Voivodeship (north Poland)